The hourglass figure is one of four traditional female body shapes described by the fashion industry. The other shapes are the rectangular, inverted triangle, and spoon/pear. The hourglass shape is defined by a woman's body measurements- the circumference of the bust, waist and hips. Hourglass body shapes have a wide bust, a narrow waist, and wide hips with a similar measurement to that of the bust. This body shape is named for its resemblance to that of an hourglass where the upper and lower half are wide and roughly equal while the middle is narrow in circumference, making the overall shape wide-narrow-wide. Women who exhibit the hourglass figure have been shown to be more admired, which can put pressure on women whose body shapes are noticeably different to strive to achieve the hourglass figure. This can lead to body dissatisfaction which can cause eating disorders in young women from all over the globe.

Evolution of female body shape

It has been proposed by scientists that the evolutionary reason for the female body shape is due in part to this sexual selection. Sex-typical body shapes (a man's muscular physique and a woman's hourglass figure) are an outcome of evolutionary adaptation for reproductive fitness because they convey information about gene quality, health and fertility, which are important elements for mate selection. Bipedalism may be related to the differences of the female and male body shapes. During pregnancy a woman's body is transformed so it is properly able to carry the baby. To prevent the center of gravity in a woman's body from being off balance, it is believed that evolution could have favored fat deposits in the gluteal region and the thighs.
A systematic review over multiple studies found the strongest cue of a low WHR (waist–hip ratio) to be age and sex. And that there is not enough evidence to conclude that a low WHR is a sign for health, fertility or better reproductive success.

Body weight and hormones

When it comes to body weight and hormones, it is dependent on a female's family background and what changes she can expect while she goes through puberty. Fat distribution in women is at its highest from their early teens to late middle age. Sex hormones play an important role in specific regions of the body helping with the regulation and accumulation of fat. Fat distribution occurs in women because estrogen lessens the adipose distribution to the abdominal region and stimulates fat growth in the gluteofemoral region. Testosterone, on the other hand, has the opposite effect. While estrogen lessens the production of fat in the abdominal region, testosterone stimulates the growth of fat in the abdominal region.

History

The first representations of truly fashionable women appear in the 14th century.  Before this, the Venus of Willendorf dating from the Ice Age stresses full aesthetic encompassing.  Between the 14th and 16th centuries in northern Europe, bulging bellies were deemed desirable, however the rest of the figure was generally thin. This is most easily visible in paintings of nudes from the time. When looking at clothed images, the belly is often visible through a mass of otherwise concealing, billowing, loose robes. Since the stomach was the only visible anatomical feature, it became exaggerated in nude depictions while the rest of the body was de-emphasized. This was true in southern Europe around the time of the renaissance. Though the classical aesthetic was being revived and studied, the art produced in the time period was influenced by both factors. This resulted in a beauty standard that reconciled the two aesthetics by using classically proportioned figures who had non-classical amounts of flesh and soft, padded skin. In the nude paintings of the 17th century, such as those by Rubens, the naked women appear quite fat. Upon closer inspection however, most of the women have fairly normal figures- Rubens has simply painted their flesh with rolls and ripples that otherwise would not be there. This may be a reflection of the female style of the day: a long, cylindrical, corseted gown with rippling satin accents. Thus Rubens' women have a tubular body with rippling embellishments.

While the corset continued to be fashionable into the 18th century, it shortened, became more conical, and consequently began to emphasize the waist. It also lifted and separated the breasts as opposed to the 17th century corsets which compressed and minimized the breasts. Consequently, depictions of nude women in the 18th century tend to have a very narrow waist and high, distinct breasts, almost as if they were wearing an invisible corset. La maja desnuda is a clear example of this aesthetic. The 19th century maintained the general figure of the 18th century. Examples can be seen in the works of many contemporary artists, both academic artists, such as Cabanel, Ingres, and Bouguereau, and impressionists, such as Degas, Renoir, and Toulouse-Lautrec. As the 20th century began, the rise of athletics resulted in a drastic slimming of the female figure. This culminated in the 1920s flapper look, which has informed modern fashion ever since. The last 100 years envelop the time period in which that overall body type has been seen as attractive, though there have been small changes within the period as well. The 1920s was the time in which the overall silhouette of the ideal body slimmed down. There was dramatic flattening of the entire body resulting in a more youthful aesthetic. In the 1930s, American goods such as the Coca-Cola bottle were exported for the first time to Jamaica. Today in the Jamaican culture the Coca-Cola bottle has now become the representation of a perfect women's body. Women with curves that are shaped to look like the coke bottle got the highest compliments from men while skinny women were mocked and ridiculed for not having this idolized body shape.

Corsets

In the mid to late 1800s, during the Victorian era, the hourglass corset was used to accentuate the hourglass body shape that became popular and ideal. It accentuated a woman’s waist by compressing and reducing its size by force to allow a woman who had a straight figure to display the hourglass shape. The corset is iconic with the image of a woman being helped by her maids. The maids are pulling on strings at the back of the woman's corset in order to tighten it and reduce the size of the wearer's waist. The hourglass corset varied and developed as time passed but the basic design and intention of the corset remained the same– the reduction of the waist line in order to create the ideal hourglass body shape where the bust and hips were similar in measurement while being much wider than the narrow waist. Even though the corsets of this time were able to give women the body of their dreams, it was also harmful and damaging to their bodies over time. This well-known historical attempt at changing a woman's body shape — corseting of the waist to make an hourglass figure — had lasting effects on the skeleton, deforming the ribs and misaligning the spine.

Women's fashion

The return of the hourglass figure has been influenced by many different things, including the different roles women play at home and in the workplace. This reflects the fact that women in today's society have more control over what they look like than they did in years past. In the 1960s women celebrated liberation by wearing skimpy mini skirts, in the '70s bohemian fashion emerged thanks to the feminist movement, and in the '80s the fight for equality in the workplace led many women to choose attire that drew less attention to their bodies.

Plus-size women in the fashion industry

The hourglass figure is perhaps the most iconic of the four major body shapes, as reflected by the fashion industry. Such fashion designers as Christian Dior have designed clothes with the female hourglass body shape in mind.  Fashion designers of today continue to design clothes to fit the hourglass body shape even though the body shapes of modern women are changing and becoming much more varied. Even now when  plus-size is included in the fashion industry as well as being more commonly produced by various groups of clothing designers, the hourglass shape is a great influence on the design of plus-sized clothes. Models of plus size clothing retain the coveted hourglass figure, albeit larger than the models of regular clothing. Research conducted in Britain by the University College London and the London College of Fashion found that less than 10% of women had an hourglass body shape. The smooth and narrow waist continues to dominate in fashion designs meant to cater to plus-size women even when that particular body shape, the hourglass, is not commonly found.

Research

Recent research indicates that men have a marked preference for women who have the hourglass figure. These studies found that this shape was even more highly preferred than breast size or facial features. While it is true that most men were initially drawn to a woman's cleavage, it was her hips and waist that were in fact what they found the most attractive. Scientists observed that the most desirable waist-to-hip ratio was 0.7- a waist that measures 70 percent of the circumference of the hips. Some examples of women who possess or have possessed the "perfect" body were Marilyn Monroe, Jessica Alba and Alessandra Ambrosio. A scientist on one of the studies speculated that the 0.7 ratio might signal female fertility. Recent studies have shown that only about 8 percent of women today have the sort of hourglass figure flaunted by curvaceous 1950s film stars such as Sophia Loren. Of the 6,000 women's body shapes analyzed in the study, 46 percent were described as rectangular, with the waist less than nine inches smaller than the hips or bust. Just over 20 percent of women were bottom-heavy "spoons", or pear shapes, with hips two inches larger than busts or more, while almost 14 percent were "inverted triangles" - women whose busts were three or more inches bigger than their hips.

References

Body shape
Female beauty
Feminism and health